Mbuna (pronounced Mmm-boo - nah ) is the common name for a large group of African cichlids from Lake Malawi, and are members of the haplochromine family. The name mbuna means "rockfish" in the language of the Tonga people of Malawi. As the name implies, most mbuna are cichlids that live among the piles of rocks and along the rocky shores of Lake Malawi, as opposed to the utaka, cichlids that live in the open water or on sandy shores or soft substrates. Some species of mbuna are highly sexually dimorphic, although many are not. Among biologists, almost all of the  cichlid species of Lake Malawi, including mbuna and non mbuna such as the utaka, are believed to have descended from one or a very few species that became isolated in the lake. With rising water levels, new habitats could be colonized and the many isolated rocky outcrops allowed new mbuna species to form. Their striking colors, intriguing behavioral characteristics, and relative hardiness make them very popular despite their unique demands for the home aquarist.

Mbuna in aquaria 

These cichlids are some of the most colorful freshwater fish for the home aquarium. Mbuna are very aggressive and territorial fish, they are not suitable for beginner fishkeepers. A suitable aquarium setting includes many rocks, adequate filtration, caves, and hiding places; plants may be uprooted, so they are best avoided, but a small number will work well in the aquarium.  One of these is Java fern, which may become the object of mbuna aggression, but will not be eaten due to an undesirable taste.

Social behavior
Mbuna exhibit strong social behavior and establish a clearly visible social hierarchy including well-defined and enforced territories.  A dominant male maintains a spherical territory, only allowing females to enter this territory for breeding purposes. Overcrowding helps spread out the aggression caused by these territorial conflicts.  They, like  Astatotilapia burtoni, are maternal mouthbrooders and breed readily in good conditions.

Water parameters 
All species from Lake Malawi thrive in the temperature range of 77-84 °F. pH 7.5-8.4 is ideal with an almost pristine (near 0 ppm) ammonia and ammonium nitrite content.

Notable mbuna cichlids 
Many mbuna cichlids are regularly stocked and sold by pet shops. Some of the most common ones are the Bumblebee Cichlid or Hornet Cichlid (Pseudotropheus crabro), Golden Cichlid (Melanochromis auratus), Electric Yellow or Yellow Lab Cichlid (Labidochromis caeruleus), Red Zebra Cichlid (Maylandia estherae), Blue Zebra Cichlid (Maylandia callainos), and Blue Johannii Melanochromis cyaneorhabdos. Many of these species are considered to have large territorial needs and aggressively defend these territories. Cichlids belonging to any of the genera listed below are considered mbuna.

Abactochromis Oliver & Arnegard 2010
Chindongo Shan Li, Konings and Stauffer, 2016
Cyathochromis Trewavas 1935
Cynotilapia Regan 1922
Genyochromis Trewavas 1935
Gephyrochromis Boulenger 1901 
Iodotropheus Oliver & Loiselle 1972 
Labeotropheus Ahl 1926 
Labidochromis Trewavas 1935
Maylandia Meyer & Foerster 1984. (syn. Metriaclima Stauffer, Bowers, Kellogg, & McKaye 1997 )
Melanochromis Trewavas 1935
Petrotilapia Trewavas 1935
Pseudotropheus Regan 1922
Tropheops Trewavas 1984

The list below includes groups of nonmbuna mouthbrooding cichlids from Lake Malawi.
 Peacock cichlids (Aulonocara species)
 Utaka cichlids
 Other genera such as Rhamphochromis

References

See also 
List of freshwater aquarium fish species
Utaka
Cichlids
Aquarium

Pseudocrenilabrinae

Fish common names